Katsanochoria is a former municipality in the Ioannina regional unit, Epirus, Greece. Since the 2011 local government reform it is part of the municipality North Tzoumerka, of which it is a municipal unit. The municipal unit has an area of 103.396 km2. Population 2,181 (2011). The seat of the municipality was in Kalentzi.

References

Populated places in Ioannina (regional unit)